The Serpent Rings is the 21st studio album from the rock group Magnum. The album was released on 17 January 2020. The album was the first Magnum album to feature Dennis Ward on bass, after long-time bassist Al Barrow left the band in June 2019.

The cover was painted by Rodney Matthews. As usual, it features several references to previous album covers, including "the Storyteller" from On a Storyteller's Night.

The Serpent Rings peaked at 5 in the German charts, the highest position the band has achieved there to date. It also charted at 7 in Switzerland, the same position reached by Wings of Heaven in 1988. The album ranked 36 in the United Kingdom, a step back compared to the previous album, Lost on the Road to Eternity, and close to the positions reached by the three albums preceding said release. The album also charted at 47 in Austria, being the third Magnum album to chart there.

The band planned a European tour after the release, but were forced to reschedule several times due to the COVID-19 pandemic. Ultimately, The Serpent Rings got no tour of its own; by the time the band embarked on their March 2022 tour, their next studio album, The Monster Roars, had already been released.

Track listing

Personnel
Tony Clarkin – guitar
Bob Catley – vocals
Dennis Ward – bass guitar
Rick Benton – keyboards
Lee Morris – drums

Charts

See also
List of 2020 albums

References

2020 albums
Magnum (band) albums
SPV GmbH albums
Albums with cover art by Rodney Matthews